Klaus Kobusch (born 15 March 1941) is a retired German track cyclist. He won a bronze medal at the 1964 Olympics in the 2000 m tandem and finished fifth in the 2000 m sprint at the 1968 Games. In the 1964 tandem semifinals, he and Willi Fuggerer apparently won 2:1 against the Italian team, but were disqualified in the third race for moving out of their lane in the final sprint.

References

External links

 

1941 births
Living people
German male cyclists
Cyclists at the 1964 Summer Olympics
Cyclists at the 1968 Summer Olympics
Olympic bronze medalists for the United Team of Germany
Olympic cyclists of the United Team of Germany
Olympic cyclists of West Germany
Olympic medalists in cycling
Sportspeople from Bielefeld
Medalists at the 1964 Summer Olympics
Cyclists from North Rhine-Westphalia